Phtheochroa jerichoana is a species of moth of the family Tortricidae. It is found in Palestine, Saudi Arabia, Bahrain and Iran (Laristan).

References

Moths described in 1935
Phtheochroa